Seraphina Sforza (1434 – 8 September 1478), born Sveva da Montefeltro, was an Italian noblewoman and nun, a Poor Clare after her husband Alessandro Sforza discarded her.

She was beatified by Pope Benedict XIV in 1754, and her feast is kept on 9 September by Franciscans.

Life
She was born in Urbino to Guido Antonio of Montefeltro, Count of Urbino, and Caterina Colonna in the first half of 1434. Her father having died in 1438, and her mother in 1443, she was cared for in Urbino first by her elder brother Oddantonio da Montefeltro, who had succeeded their father as Count, and then by her half-brother Federico da Montefeltro, who succeeded Oddantonio after his assassination in 1444. In March 1446, aged around 12, she moved to Rome where she stayed for more than a year, under the protection of her maternal uncle Cardinal Prospero Colonna (cardinal).

In 1448 Seraphina married Alessandro Sforza, Lord of Pesaro. Some time after, her husband left to support his brother Francesco I Sforza as Duke of Milan. During his six-year absence, Seraphina was entrusted with governing Pesaro.  Upon his return, her husband gave himself up to a dissolute life, and ill-treated her. He forced her to enter the convent of Poor Clares at Pesaro.

In 1475 Seraphina was elected abbess of the monastery at Pesaro, where she died in 1478. Her body, exhumed some years after her death, was found incorrupt, and is preserved in Pesaro Cathedral.

References

Sources

1434 births
1478 deaths
Serafina
People from Urbino
Italian beatified people
15th-century venerated Christians
15th-century Italian Roman Catholic religious sisters and nuns
Montefeltro family
Venerated Catholics
Beatifications by Pope Benedict XIV